Ruggero Marzoli (born 2 April 1976, in Spoltore) is an Italian professional road bicycle racer. After a previous four-month ban in 1999, Marzoli was banned for six months in 2008, after being considered guilty for the attempted use of prohibited substances in relation to the Oil for Drugs case. CONI had appealed for Marzoli to be banned for life, because it was a second offence.

Major achievements 

2002
1st, Stage 4, Giro della Provincia di Lucca
1st, Stage 4, Settimana internazionale di Coppi e Bartali
2003
1st, Stage 4, Giro d'Abruzzo
3rd, Overall, Tirreno–Adriatico
1st, Stage 5
1st, Stage 4, Tour de Pologne
2004
1st, Stage 2, Giro d'Abruzzo
1st, Stage 5, Settimana internazionale di Coppi e Bartali
2005
1st, Trofeo Matteotti
1st, Stage 1, Tour of Slovenia
2007
1st, Stage 3, Circuit de Lorraine

References

External links

1976 births
Living people
Italian male cyclists
people from Spoltore
Cyclists from Abruzzo